Medical History is a compilation album of songs by drum & bass DJ, producer and musician Danny Byrd. It contains ten tracks from six different Danny Byrd singles released from 2000 to 2007. It was released as a digital download on 5 March 2007.

Other Hospital Records artists have their own compilation albums of the same name.

Track listing

Release history

References

2008 albums
Danny Byrd albums